George Benson (born 1943) is an American jazz guitarist, singer and composer.

George Benson may also refer to:

George Benson (dean) (1613–1692), dean of Hereford Cathedral
George Benson (theologian) (1699–1762), English Presbyterian minister and theologian
George Benson (Quaker) (1808–1879), 19th-century American Quaker
George Benson (architect) (1856-1935), British architect
George Courtney Benson (1886–1960), Australian official war artist
George Benson (politician) (1889–1973), British Member of Parliament
George Benson (footballer) (1893–1974), English soccer player
George S. Benson (1898–1991), American missionary and president of Harding College
George C. S. Benson (1908–1999), American academic and founding president of Claremont McKenna College
George Benson (actor) (1911–1983), English actor
George Benson (American football) (1919–2001), professional football player
George Benson (civic organizer) (1919–2004), American civic leader
P. George Benson (born 1946), American academic
George Benson (saxophonist) (1929–2019), American jazz saxophonist

See also
George Benson Hall (1780–1821), British naval officer, Canadian politician 
George Benson Hall Jr. (1810–1876), Canadian lumber and sawmill businessman, son of the above